Eric Foster may refer to:

Eric Foster (American football) (born 1985), American football player
Eric Foster (politician) (born 1949), Canadian politician
Eric Foster White (born 1962), American songwriter

Fictional characters
Eric Foster (Hollyoaks), a character in the television soap opera Hollyoaks